Monaco competed at the 1996 Summer Olympics in Atlanta, Georgia, United States.

Results by event

Swimming
Men's 100m Breaststroke
Christophe Verdino
 Heat – 01:05.66 (→ did not advance, 36th place) 

Men's 200m Breaststroke
Christophe Verdino
 Heat – 2:20.77 (→ did not advance, 27th place)

References
Official Olympic Reports

Nations at the 1996 Summer Olympics
1996 Summer Olympics
1996 in Monégasque sport